Choi Hong-hi (9 November 1918 – 15 June 2002) was a South Korean Army general, defector to North Korea, and martial artist who was an important figure in the history of the Korean martial art of Taekwondo, albeit controversial due to his attempt to introduce the martial art in North Korea, and his eventual defection to the North in 1979.

Choi is regarded by many as the "Founder of Taekwon-Do"—most often by organisations belonging to the International Taekwon-Do Federation (ITF), the first international federation for Taekwondo, which he founded before the World Taekwondo Federation split off in 1973 for political reasons. Others, such as the World Taekwondo Federation, now just World Taekwondo (WT), portray Choi as either an unimportant or a dishonorable figure in taekwondo history, whether by omitting him from their versions of taekwondo history or through explicit statements, due to the aforementioned controversy.

Early life 
Choi was born on 9 November 1918 in Hwa Dae, Myŏngch'ŏn county, in what is now North Korea, which was then under Japanese rule. At the time, the place was named Meigawa-gun (Myongchon-kun), Kankyo-hokudo (Hamgyong-Pukto), Chosen, as part of the Empire of Japan. Choi originally claimed that his father sent him to study calligraphy under Han Il Dong, who was also "a master of Taekkyeon, the ancient Korean art of foot fighting" (Park, 1993, p. 241). He later recanted this story and said that he never studied taekkyeon and that it had nothing to contribute to taekwondo. Choi travelled to Japan, where he studied English, mathematics, and karate. In Kyoto, he met a fellow Korean with the surname Kim, who was a karate instructor and taught Choi this martial art. Choi also learned Shotokan karate under Funakoshi Gichin. Just before he had left Korea, Choi apparently had a disagreement with a wrestler named Hu, and the possibility of a future confrontation inspired him to train; in his own words, "I would imagine that these were the techniques I would use to defend myself against the wrestler, Mr. Hu, if he did attempt to carry out his promise to tear me limb from limb when I eventually returned to Korea" (Park, 1993, p. 242). Choi attained the rank of 1st dan in karate in 1939, and then 2nd dan soon after.

Military career 
Choi was forced to serve in the Japanese army during World War II, but was implicated in a rebellion and imprisoned, during which time he continued practicing martial arts. Following the war, in January 1946, Choi was commissioned as a second lieutenant in the Korean army. From 1946 to 1951, Choi received promotions to first lieutenant, captain, major, lieutenant colonel, colonel, and then brigadier general. Choi was promoted to major general in 1954.

Taekwondo 
Choi combined elements of Taekkyon and Oh Do Kwan Karate and Tang Soo Do to develop a style of the martial art known as "Taekwondo"; his organization spelt it Taekwon-Do, (태권도; 跆拳道), which means "foot, fist, art" or "the way of hand and foot" and it was so named on 11 April 1955. Choi founded the Oh Do Kwan, and held an honorary 4th dan ranking in the Chung Do Kwan. Due to accusations of dishonesty, Choi was stripped of his rank and position in the Chung Do Kwan. During the 1960s, Choi and Nam Tae-hi led the original masters of taekwondo in promoting their martial art around the world, though these would be only the first of many such endeavors.

ITF taekwondo organizations credit Choi with starting the spread of taekwondo internationally by stationing Korean taekwondo instructors around the world, and have consistently claimed that ITF-style taekwondo is the only authentic style of taekwondo, most notably in early sections of its textbooks. He was also the author of the first English taekwondo syllabus book, Taekwon-Do, published by Daeha Publication Company in 1965. In 1972, Choi went into exile in Canada after the South Korean government objected to his introduction of the sport into North Korea, and the South Korea government formed the World Taekwondo Federation (WTF) in 1973 (renamed to WT in 2018). In 1979 he traveled and defected to North Korea where he was welcomed by the government and supported in his project of spreading Taekwondo to the world. He was remembered as the founder and champion of taekwondo.

Death 
Choi died of cancer on 15 June 2002 in Pyongyang, North Korea, where he received a state funeral in the Patriotic Martyrs' Cemetery. On his funeral committee were:

 Choe Thae-bok
 Kim Jung-rin
 Kim Yong-sun
 Kim Yong-dae
 Ryu Mi-yong
 Ryom Sun-gil
 Kim Kyong-ho
 Sung Sang-sop
 Pak Sun-hui
 An Kyong-ho
 Kang Ryon-hak
 Chang Ung
 Hwang Pong-yong
 Kim Yu-ho

Choi is listed in the Taekwondo Hall of Fame with various titles: "Father of Taekwon-Do," "Founder and First President of the International Taekwon-Do Federation," and "Founder of Oh Do Kwan." Choi is survived by his wife, Choi Joon-hee; his son, Choi Jung-hwa; two daughters, Sunny and Meeyun; and several grandchildren.

See also 
 List of taekwondo grandmasters

Explanatory notes 

a.  The spelling of "taekwondo" varies widely in English usage. The WT and affiliated organizations typically use "taekwondo," while the ITF and affiliated organizations typically use "taekwon-do" (as Choi used this spelling). In Wikipedia, the default spelling is "taekwondo." This article follows this standard, but uses "taekwon-do" when referring specifically to the ITF or affiliated organizations' names.

b.  In Park's (1993) article, the note on Choi's promotion to 2nd dan in karate is followed by a note about the outbreak of World War II, which would suggest that Choi's 2nd dan promotion occurred no later than the early stages of that conflict (c. 1939–1940).

References

External links 
 Obituary: General Choi Hong-hi Biography in Moosin Magazine, 19 January 2015.
 Obituary: General Choi Hong-hi in The Guardian, 9 August 2002.
 Obituary: General Choi Hong-Hi in The Daily Telegraph, 26 June 2002.
 General Choi Hong-hi at the Taekwondo Hall of Fame, including a photograph of Choi's grave.

1918 births
2002 deaths
20th-century philanthropists
International Olympic Committee members
Korean generals
Martial arts school founders
Martial arts writers
People from Myongchon County
South Korean emigrants to North Korea
South Korean male karateka
South Korean male taekwondo practitioners
Hong-hi